The Philippines campaign, also known as the Battle of the Philippines or the Fall of the Philippines, was the invasion of the Philippines by the Empire of Japan and the defense of the islands by United States and the Philippine Armies during World War II. It took place between December 8, 1941 and May 8, 1942.

The defending forces outnumbered the Japanese by a ratio of 3:2 but were a mixed force of non-combat-experienced regular, national guard, constabulary and newly created Commonwealth units. The Japanese used first-line troops at the outset of the campaign, and by concentrating their forces, they swiftly overran most of Luzon during the first month.

The Japanese high command, believing that they had won the campaign, made a strategic decision to advance by a month their timetable of operations in Borneo and Indonesia and to withdraw their best division and the bulk of their airpower in early January 1942.<ref>[http://www.history.army.mil/books/wwii/MacArthur%20Reports/MacArthur%20V2%20P1/ch6.htm#p103 Japanese Operations in the Southwest Pacific Area – Reports of General MacArthur Volume II] , p. 104.</ref> That, coupled with the defenders' decision to withdraw into a defensive holding position in the Bataan Peninsula and also the defeat of three Japanese battalions at the "Battle of the Points" and "Battle of the Pockets", enabled the Americans and Filipinos to hold out for four more months. After the Japanese failure to penetrate the Bataan defensive perimeter in February the Japanese conducted a 40-day siege. The crucial large natural harbor and port facilities of Manila Bay were denied to the Japanese until May 1942. While the Dutch East Indies operations were unaffected, this heavily hindered the Japanese offensive operations in New Guinea and the Solomon Islands, buying time for the U.S. Navy to make plans to engage the Japanese at Guadalcanal instead of much further east.

Japan's conquest of the Philippines is often considered the worst military defeat in US history. About 23,000 American military personnel and about 100,000 Filipino soldiers were killed or captured.

Background

Japanese activity

Objectives
The Japanese planned to occupy the Philippines as part of their plan for a "Greater East Asia War" in which their Southern Expeditionary Army Group seized sources of raw materials in Malaya and the Netherlands East Indies while the Combined Fleet neutralized the United States Pacific Fleet. Five years earlier, in 1936, Captain Ishikawa Shingo, a hard-liner in the Japanese navy, had toured the Philippines and other parts of the Southeast Asia, noting that these countries had raw materials Japan needed for its armed forces.  This helped further increase their aspiration for colonizing the Philippines.

The Southern Expeditionary Army was created on 6 November 1941, commanded by General Hisaichi Terauchi, who had previously been Minister of War. It was ordered to prepare for war in the event that negotiations with the United States did not succeed in peacefully meeting Japanese objectives. They also included the condition of America's acceptance of their position in the Pacific as a superior force, with the testament of their occupation of China, but they did not get what they wanted.  Under Terauchi's command were four corps-equivalent armies, comprising ten divisions and three combined arms brigades, including the Japanese Fourteenth Area Army. Operations against the Philippines and Malaya were to be conducted simultaneously when Imperial General Headquarters ordered.

The invasion of the Philippines had four objectives:
 To prevent the use of the Philippines as an advance base of operations by American forces
 To acquire staging areas and supply bases to enhance operations against the Dutch East Indies and Guam
 To secure the lines of communication between occupied areas in the south and the Japanese Home Islands
 To limit the Allied intervention when they attempt to launch an offensive campaign in Australia and the Solomon Islands via dispatching all the forces stationed in the country and other neighboring nations

Invasion forces

Terauchi assigned the Philippines invasion to the 14th Army, under the command of Lieutenant General Masaharu Homma. Air support of ground operations was provided by the 5th Air Group, under Lieutenant General Hideyoshi Obata, which was transferred to Formosa from Manchuria. The amphibious invasion was conducted by the Philippines Force under Vice Admiral Ibō Takahashi, using the Imperial Japanese Navy Third Fleet, supported by the land-based aircraft of 11th Air Fleet of Vice Admiral Nishizo Tsukahara.

The 14th Army had two first-line infantry divisions, the 16th (Susumu Morioka) and 48th Divisions (Yuitsu Tsuchihashi), to invade and conquer Luzon, and the 65th Brigade as a garrison force. The Formosa-based 48th Division, though without combat experience, was considered one of the Japanese Army's best units, was specially trained in amphibious operations, and was given the assignment of the main landing in Lingayen Gulf. The 16th Division, assigned to land at Lamon Bay, was picked as one of the best divisions still available in Japan itself and staged from the Ryukyus and Palau. The 14th Army also had the 4th and 7th Tank Regiments, five field artillery battalions, five anti-aircraft artillery battalions, four antitank companies, and a mortar battalion. An unusually strong group of combat engineer and bridging units was included in the 14th Army's support forces.

For the invasion, the Third Fleet was augmented by two destroyer squadrons and a cruiser division of the Second Fleet, and the aircraft carrier Ryūjō from the 1st Air Fleet. The Philippines Force consisted of an aircraft carrier, five heavy cruisers, five light cruisers, 29 destroyers, two seaplane tenders, minesweepers and torpedo boats.

Combined army and navy air strength allocated to support the landings was 541 aircraft. The 11th Kōkūkantai (Air Fleet) consisted of the 21st and 23rd Kōkūsentai (Air Flotillas), a combined strength of 156 G4M "Betty" and G3M "Nell" bombers, 107 A6M Zero fighters, plus seaplanes and reconnaissance planes. Most of these were based at Takao, and approximately a third were sent to Indochina in the last week of November to support operations in Malaya. The Ryujo provided an additional 16 fighters and 18 torpedo planes, and the surface ships had 68 seaplanes for search and observation, totaling 412 naval aircraft. The army's 5th Kikōshidan (Air Group) consisted of two fighter regiments, two light bomber regiments, and a heavy bomber regiment, totaling 192 aircraft: 76 Ki-21 "Sally", Ki-48 "Lily", and Ki-30 "Ann" bombers; 36 Ki-27 "Nate" fighters, and 19 Ki-15 "Babs" and Ki-36 "Ida" observation planes.

Defenses

USAFFE
From mid-1941, following increased tension between Japan and several other powers, including the United States, Britain and the Netherlands, many countries in South East Asia and the Pacific began to prepare for the possibility of war.
By December 1941, the combined defense forces in the Philippines were organized into the US Army Forces in the Far East (USAFFE), which eventually included the Philippine Army's 1st Regular Division, 2nd (Constabulary) Division, and 10 mobilized reserve divisions, and the United States Army's Philippine Department. General Douglas MacArthur was recalled from retirement by the U.S. War Department and named commander of USAFFE on July 26, 1941. MacArthur had retired in 1937 after two years as military advisor to the Philippine Commonwealth, and accepted control of the Philippine Army, tasked by the Filipino government with reforming an army made up primarily of reservists lacking equipment, training and organization.

On July 31, 1941, the Philippine Department had 22,532 troops assigned, approximately half of them Filipino. MacArthur recommended the reassignment of department commander Major General George Grunert in October 1941 and took command himself. The main component of the department was the U.S. Army Philippine Division, a 10,500-man formation that consisted mostly of Philippine Scouts (PS) combat units. The Philippine Department had been reinforced between August and November 1941 by 8,500 troops of the U.S. Army Air Forces, and by three Army National Guard units, including its only armor, two battalions of M3 light tanks. These units, the 200th Coast Artillery Regiment (an antiaircraft unit), 192nd Tank Battalion, and 194th Tank Battalion, drew troops from New Mexico, Wisconsin, Illinois, Ohio, Kentucky, Minnesota, Missouri, and California. After reinforcement, the department's strength as of November 30, 1941 was 31,095, including 11,988 Philippine Scouts.

MacArthur organized USAFFE into four tactical commands. The North Luzon Force, activated December 3, 1941 under Maj. Gen. Jonathan M. Wainwright, defended the most likely sites for amphibious attacks and the central plains of Luzon. Wainwright's forces included the PA 11th, 21st and 31st Infantry Divisions, the U.S. 26th Cavalry Regiment (PS), a battalion of the 45th Infantry (PS), and the 1st Provisional Artillery Group of two batteries of 155 mm guns and one 2.95 inch (75 mm) mountain gun. The Philippine 71st Infantry Division served as a reserve and could be committed only on the authority of MacArthur.

The South Luzon Force, activated December 13, 1941 under Brig. Gen. George M. Parker Jr., controlled a zone east and south of Manila. Parker had the PA 41st and 51st Infantry Divisions and the 2nd Provisional Artillery Group of two batteries of the US 86th Field Artillery Regiment (PS).

The Visayan–Mindanao Force under Brig. Gen. William F. Sharp comprised the PA 61st, 81st, and 101st Infantry Divisions, reinforced after the start of the war by the newly inducted 73rd and 93rd Infantry Regiments. The 61st Division was located on Panay, the 81st on Cebu and Negros, and the 101st on Mindanao. In January a fourth division, the 102nd, was created on Mindanao from the field artillery regiments of the 61st and 81st Divisions acting as infantry (they had no artillery pieces), and the 103rd Infantry of the 101st Division. The 2nd Infantry of the Philippine Army's 1st Regular Division and the 2nd Battalion of the U.S. 43rd Infantry (Philippine Scouts) were also made a part of the Mindanao Force.

USAFFE's Reserve Force, under MacArthur's direct control, was composed of the Philippine Division, the 91st Division (PA), and headquarters units from the PA and Philippine Department, positioned just north of Manila. The 192nd and 194th Tank Battalions formed the separate Provisional Tank Group, also under MacArthur's direct command, at Clark Field/Fort Stotsenburg, where they were positioned as a mobile defense against any attempt by airborne units to seize the field.

Four U.S. Coast Artillery Corps regiments guarded the entrance to Manila Bay, including Corregidor Island. Across a narrow 3 kilometre (2 mi) strait of water from Bataan on Corregidor was Fort Mills, defended by batteries of the 59th and 60th Coast Artillery Regiments (the latter an anti-aircraft unit), and the 91st and 92nd Coast Artillery Regiments (Philippine Scouts) of the Harbor Defenses of Manila and Subic Bays. The 59th CA acted as a supervisory unit for the batteries of all units positioned on Forts Hughes, Drum, Frank, and Wint. The majority of the forts had been built circa 1910–1915 and, except for Fort Drum and Battery Monja on Corregidor, were unprotected against air and high-angle artillery attack except by camouflage.

The USAFFE's aviation arm was the Far East Air Force (FEAF) of the U.S. Army Air Forces, commanded by Maj. Gen. Lewis H. Brereton. Previously the Philippine Department Air Force and Air Force USAFFE, the air force was activated on November 16, 1941, and was the largest USAAF combat air organization outside the United States. Its primary combat power in December 1941 consisted of 91 serviceable P-40 Warhawk fighters and 34 B-17 Flying Fortress bombers, with further modern aircraft en route. Tactically the FEAF was part of the Reserve Force, so that it fell under MacArthur's direct command.

As of November 30, 1941, the strength of US Army Troops in the Philippines, including Philippine units, was 31,095, consisting of 2,504 officers and
28,591 enlisted (16,643 Americans and 11,957 Philippine Scouts).

Mobilization
MacArthur's mobilization plans called for induction of the ten reserve divisions between September 1 and December 15, 1941. The timetable was met on September 1 with the induction of one regiment per division, but slowed as a lack of facilities and equipment hampered training. The second regiments of the divisions were not called up until November 1, and the third regiments were not organized until after hostilities began. Training was also seriously inhibited by language difficulties between the American cadres and the Filipino troops, and by the many differing dialects (estimated at 70) of the numerous ethnic groups comprising the army. By the outbreak of war, only two-thirds of the army had been mobilized, but additions to the force continued with the induction of the Constabulary and a portion of the regular army, until a force of approximately 130,000 men was reached.

The most crucial equipment shortfalls were in rifles and divisional light artillery. MacArthur requested 84,500 M1 Garand rifles to replace the World War I M1917 Enfields equipping the PA, of which there were adequate numbers, but the War Department denied the request because of production difficulties. The divisions had only 20% of their artillery requirements, and while plans had been approved to significantly reduce this gap, the arrangements came too late to be implemented before war isolated the Philippines.

By contrast, the Philippine Division was adequately manned, equipped, and trained. MacArthur received immediate approval to modernize it by reorganizing it as a mobile "triangular" division. Increasing the authorized size of the Philippine Scouts was not politically viable (because of resentments within the less-well-paid Philippine Army), so MacArthur's plan also provided for freeing up Philippine Scouts to round out other units. The transfer of the American 34th Infantry from the 8th Infantry Division in the United States to the Philippine Division, accompanied by two field artillery battalions to create a pair of complete regimental combat teams, was actually underway when war broke out. The deployment ended with the troops still in the United States, where they were sent to defend Hawaii instead.

Other defense forces
The United States Asiatic Fleet and 16th Naval District, based at Manila, provided the naval defenses for the Philippines. Commanded by Admiral Thomas C. Hart, the surface combatants of the Asiatic Fleet were the heavy cruiser , the light cruiser , and thirteen World War I-era destroyers. Its primary striking power lay in the 23 modern submarines assigned to the Asiatic Fleet. Submarine Squadron (SUBRON) Two consisted of 6 s, and SUBRON Five of 11 Porpoise and s. In September 1941, naval patrol forces in the Philippines were augmented by the arrival of the six PT boats of Motor Torpedo Boat Squadron Three. In December 1941, the naval forces were augmented by the schooner .

The U.S. 4th Marine Regiment, stationed in Shanghai, China, since the late 1920s, had anticipated a withdrawal from China during the summer of 1941. As personnel were routinely transferred back to the United States or separated from the service, the regimental commander, Col. Samuel L. Howard, arranged unofficially for all replacements to be placed in the 1st Special Defense Battalion, based at Cavite. When the 4th Marines arrived in the Philippines on November 30, 1941, it incorporated the Marines at Cavite and Olongapo Naval Stations into its understrength ranks. An initial plan to divide the 4th into two regiments, mixing each with a battalion of Philippine Constabulary, was discarded after Howard showed reluctance, and the 4th was stationed on Corregidor to augment the defenses there, with details detached to Bataan to protect USAFFE headquarters.

Additionally the U.S. Coast and Geodetic Survey, a paramilitary survey force, operated in Manila with the ship USC&GSS Research.

Far East Air Force controversy

News reached the Philippines that an attack on Pearl Harbor was in progress at 2:20 am local time on December 8, 1941.The attack on Pearl Harbor had occurred on December 7 by local, Hawaiian time. This was December 8 in the Philippines, which is on the other side of the International Date Line. Clock time in the Philippines was 18 hours 30 minutes ahead of Hawaiian time (see zoneinfo database). FEAF interceptors had already conducted an air search for incoming aircraft reported shortly after midnight, but these had been Japanese scout planes reporting weather conditions. At 3:30 am, Brigadier General Richard Sutherland, chief of staff to General Douglas MacArthur, heard about the attack from a commercial radio broadcast. At 5:00 am FEAF commander Gen. Brereton reported to USAFFE headquarters where he attempted to see MacArthur without success. He recommended to MacArthur's chief of staff, Brig. Gen. Richard Sutherland, that FEAF launch bombing missions against Formosa in accordance with Rainbow 5 war plan directives from which an attack was likely to come. Authorization was withheld, but shortly afterward, in response to a telegram from General George C. Marshall instructing MacArthur to implement Rainbow 5, Brereton was ordered to have a strike in readiness for later approval.Correll, "Caught on the Ground".

Through a series of disputed discussions and decisions, authorization for the first raid was not approved until 10:15 am local time for an attack just before sunset, with a follow-up raid at dawn the next day. In the meantime, Japanese plans to attack Clark and Iba Fields using land-based naval bombers and Zero fighters were delayed six hours by fog at its Formosa bases, so that only a small scale Japanese Army mission attacked targets in the northern tip of Luzon. At 08:00 am, Brereton received a phone call from Gen. Henry H. Arnold warning him not to allow his aircraft to be attacked while still on the ground. FEAF launched three squadron-sized fighter patrols and all of its serviceable bombers on Luzon between 08:00 and 08:30 am as a precautionary move. After MacArthur gave Brereton the authorization he sought at 10:15 am, the bombers were ordered to land and prepare for the afternoon raid on Formosa. All three pursuit squadrons began to run short on fuel and broke off their patrols at the same time.

The 20th Pursuit Squadron's Curtiss P-40B interceptors patrolled the area while the bombers landed at Clark Field between 10:30 and 10:45, then dispersed to their revetments for servicing. The 17th Pursuit Squadron, based at Nichols Field, also landed at Clark and had its aircraft refueled while its pilots ate lunch, then put its pilots on alert shortly after 11:00. All but two of the Clark Field B-17s were on the ground.

At 11:27 am and 11:29 am, the radar post at Iba Field detected two incoming raids while the closest was still 130 miles out. It alerted FEAF headquarters and the command post at Clark Field, a warning that reached only the pursuit group commander, Major Orrin L. Grover, who apparently became confused by multiple and conflicting reports. The 3rd Pursuit Squadron took off from Iba at 11:45 with instructions to intercept the western force, which was thought to have Manila as its target, but dust problems during its takeoff resulted in the fragmentation of its flights. Two flights of the 21st Pursuit Squadron (PS) at Nichols Field, six P-40Es, took off at 11:45, led by 1st Lt. William Dyess. They started for Clark but were diverted to Manila Bay as a second line of defense if the 3rd PS failed to intercept its force. The 21st's third flight, taking off five minutes later, headed toward Clark, although engine problems with its brand-new P-40Es reduced its numbers by two. The 17th Pursuit Squadron took off at 12:15 pm from Clark, ordered to patrol Bataan and Manila Bay, while the 34th PS at Del Carmen never received its orders to protect Clark Field and did not launch. The 20th PS, dispersed at Clark, was ready to take off but did not receive orders from group headquarters. Instead a line chief saw the incoming formation of Japanese bombers and the section commander, 1st Lt. Joseph H. Moore, ordered the scramble himself.

Even though tracked by radar and with three U.S. pursuit squadrons in the air, when Japanese bombers of the 11th Kōkūkantai attacked Clark Field at 12:40 pm, they achieved tactical surprise. Two squadrons of B-17s were dispersed on the ground. Most of the P-40s of the 20th PS were preparing to taxi and were struck by the first wave of 27 Japanese twin-engine Mitsubishi G3M "Nell" bombers; only four of the 20th PS P-40Bs managed to take off as the bombs were falling.

A second bomber attack (26 Mitsubishi G4M "Betty" bombers) followed closely, then escorting Zero fighters strafed the field for 30 minutes, destroying 12 of the 17 American heavy bombers present and seriously damaging three others. Two damaged B-17s were made flyable and taken to Mindanao, where one of them was destroyed in a ground collision.

A near-simultaneous attack on the auxiliary field at Iba to the northwest by 54 "Betty" bombers was also successful: all but four of the 3rd Pursuit Squadron's P-40s, short on fuel and caught in their landing pattern, were destroyed in combat or by lack of fuel. Twelve P-40s from the 20th (four), 21st (two), and 3rd (six) Squadrons attacked the strafers but with little success, losing at least four of their own.

The Far East Air Force lost half its planes in the 45-minute attack, and was all but destroyed over the next few days, including a number of the surviving B-17s lost to takeoff crashes of other planes. The 24th Pursuit Group flew its last interception on December 10, losing 11 of the 40 or so P-40s it sent up, and the surviving P-35s of the 34th PS were destroyed on the ground at Del Carmen. That night FEAF combat strength had been reduced to 12 operable B-17s, 22 P-40s, and 8 P-35s. Fighter strength fluctuated daily until December 24, when USAFFE ordered all its forces into Bataan. Until then P-40s and P-35s were cobbled together from spare parts taken from wrecked airplanes, and still crated P-40Es were assembled at the Philippine Air Depot. Clark Field was abandoned as a bomber field on December 11 after being used as a staging base for a handful of B-17 missions. Between December 17 and 20, the 14 surviving B-17s were withdrawn to Australia. Every other aircraft of the FEAF was destroyed or captured.

No formal investigation took place regarding this failure as it occurred in the aftermath of Pearl Harbor. After the war, Brereton and Sutherland in effect blamed each other for FEAF being surprised on the ground, and MacArthur released a statement that he had no knowledge of any recommendation to attack Formosa with B-17s. Walter D. Edmunds summarized the disaster: "in the Philippines the personnel of our armed forces almost without exception failed to assess accurately the weight, speed, and efficiency of the Japanese Air Force." He quoted Maj. Gen. Emmett O'Donnell Jr., then a major in charge of the B-17s sent to Mindanao, as concluding that the first day was a "disorganized business" and that no one was "really at fault" because no one was "geared for war."

Invasion

Initial landings

Landings on Camiguin Island and at Vigan, Aparri, and Gonzaga in northern Luzon followed two days later.

Two B-17s attacked the Japanese ships offloading at Gonzaga. Other B-17s with fighter escort attacked the landings at Vigan. In this last coordinated action of the Far East Air Force, U.S. planes damaged two Japanese transports (Oigawa Maru and Takao Maru), the cruiser , and the destroyer , and sank minesweeper W-10.

Early on the morning of December 12, the Japanese landed 2,500 men of the 16th Division at Legazpi on southern Luzon,  from the nearest American and Philippine forces. The attack on Mindanao followed on December 19, using elements of the 16th Army temporarily attached to the invasion force to permit the 14th Army to use all its troops on Luzon.

Meanwhile, Admiral Thomas C. Hart withdrew most of his U.S. Asiatic Fleet from Philippine waters following Japanese air strikes that inflicted heavy damage on U.S. naval facilities at Cavite on December 10. Only submarines were left to contest Japanese naval superiority, and the commanders of these, conditioned by prewar doctrine that held the fleet submarine to be a scouting vessel more vulnerable to air and anti-submarine attack than it actually was, proved unequal to the task. Because of this poor doctrine for submarine warfare and the infamous failures of the Mark 14 torpedo that plagued the U.S. submarine fleet for the first two years of the Pacific War, not a single Japanese warship was sunk by the Asiatic Fleet during the Philippines campaign.

In a book A Different Kind of Victory: A Biography of Admiral Thomas C. Hart (Naval Institute Press, 1981), James Leutze wrote:

"He had 27 subs submerged in Manila Bay,... it was Washington, not the Asiatic Fleet Commander that directed the fleet to withdraw from Manila.... Hart was directed by Washington to send US Navy surface forces and submarines southeast toward Australia.... Douglas MacArthur and Henry Stimson (United States Secretary of War) feuding with Admiral Hart over lack of US Navy submarine action. MacArthur asked Admiral Hart: "What in the world is the matter with your submarines?"... MacArthur complained that Hart's inactivity allowed Japan's navy freedom of action.... According to Stimson, MacArthur felt that Hart's ships and submarines were ineffectual, but because Admiral Hart had lost his courage. Admiral Hart's reaction to MacArthur's brickbats: "He (MacArthur) is inclined to cut my throat and perhaps the Navy in general.""

Main attack

The main attack began early on the morning of December 22 as 43,110 men of the 48th Division and one regiment of the 16th Division, supported by artillery and approximately 90 tanks, landed at three points along the east coast of Lingayen Gulf. A few B-17s flying from Australia attacked the invasion fleet, and U.S. submarines harassed it from the adjacent waters, but to little effect.

General Wainwright's poorly trained and equipped 11th Division (PA) and 71st Division (PA) could neither repel the landings nor pin the enemy on the beaches. The remaining Japanese units of the divisions landed farther south along the gulf. The 26th Cavalry (PS) of the well-trained and better-equipped Philippine Scouts, advancing to meet them, put up a strong fight at Rosario, but was forced to withdraw after taking heavy casualties with no hope of sufficient reinforcements. By nightfall, December 23, the Japanese had moved ten miles (16 km) into the interior.

The next day, 7,000 men of the 16th Division hit the beaches at three locations along the shore of Lamon Bay in southern Luzon, where they found General Parker's forces dispersed, and without artillery protecting the eastern coast, unable to offer serious resistance. They immediately consolidated their positions and began the drive north toward Manila where they would link up with the forces advancing south toward the capital for the final victory.

Withdrawal into Bataan
The U.S. Philippine Division moved into the field in reaction to reports of airborne drops near Clark Field, and when this proved false, were deployed to cover the withdrawal of troops into Bataan and to resist Japanese advances in the Subic Bay area.

On December 24, MacArthur invoked the prewar plan WPO-3 (War Plan Orange 3), which called for use of five delaying positions in central Luzon while forces withdrew into Bataan. This was carried out in part by the 26th Cavalry Regiment. He relieved General Parker of his command of South Luzon Force and had him begin preparing defensive positions on Bataan, using units as they arrived; both the military headquarters and the Philippine's government were moved there. Nine days of feverish movement of supplies into Bataan, primarily by barge from Manila, began in an attempt to feed an anticipated force of 43,000 troops for six months. (Ultimately 80,000 troops and 26,000 refugees flooded Bataan.) Nevertheless, substantial forces remained in other areas for several months.

On December 26, Manila was declared an open city by MacArthur. However, the United States military was still using the city for logistical purposes while the city was declared open and the Japanese army ignored the declaration and bombed the city.

Units of both defense forces were maneuvered to hold open the escape routes into Bataan, in particular San Fernando, the steel bridges at Calumpit over the deep Pampanga River at the north end of Manila Bay, and Plaridel north of Manila. The South Luzon Force, despite its inexperience and equivocating orders to withdraw and hold, successfully executed "leapfrogging" retrograde techniques and crossed the bridges by January 1. Japanese air commanders rejected appeals by the 48th Division to bomb the bridges to trap the retreating forces, which were subsequently demolished by Philippine Scout engineers on January 1.

The Japanese realized the full extent of MacArthur's plan on December 30 and ordered the 48th Division to press forward and seal off Bataan. In a series of actions between January 2 and 4, the 11th and 21st Divisions of the Philippine Army, the 26th Cavalry (PS) and the American M3 Stuart tanks of the Provisional Tank Group held open the road from San Fernando to Dinalupihan at the neck of the peninsula for the retreating forces of the South Luzon Force, then made good their own escape. Despite 50% losses in the 194th Tank Battalion during the retreat, the Stuarts and a supporting battery of 75mm SPM halftracks repeatedly stopped Japanese thrusts and were the final units to enter Bataan.

On December 30, the American 31st Infantry moved to the vicinity of Dalton Pass to cover the flanks of troops withdrawing from central and southern Luzon, while other units of the Philippine Division organized positions at Bataan. The 31st Infantry then moved to a defensive position on the west side of the Olongapo-Manila road, near Layac Junction—at the neck of Bataan Peninsula—on January 5, 1942. The junction was given up on January 6, but the withdrawal to Bataan was successful.

Battle of Bataan

From January 7 to 14, 1942, the Japanese concentrated on reconnaissance and preparations for an attack on the Main Battle Line from Abucay to Mount Natib to Mauban. At the same time, in a critical mistake, they also relieved the 48th Division, responsible for much of the success of Japanese operations, with the much less-capable 65th Brigade, intended as a garrison force. The Japanese 5th Air group was withdrawn from operations on January 5 in preparation for movement with the 48th Division to the Netherlands East Indies. U.S. and Filipino forces repelled night attacks near Abucay, and elements of the U.S. Philippine Division counterattacked on January 16. This failed, and the division withdrew to the Reserve Battle Line from Casa Pilar to Bagac in the center of the peninsula on January 26.

The 14th Army renewed its attacks on January 23 with an attempted amphibious landing behind the lines by a battalion of the 16th Division, then with general attacks beginning January 27 along the battle line. The amphibious landing was disrupted by a PT boat and contained in brutally dense jungle by ad hoc units made up of U.S. Army Air Corps troops, naval personnel, and Philippine Constabulary. The pocket was then slowly forced back to the cliffs, with high casualties on both sides. Landings to reinforce the surviving pocket on January 26 and February 2 were severely disrupted by air attacks from the few remaining FEAF P-40s, then trapped and eventually annihilated on February 13.

A penetration in the I Corps line was stopped and broken up into several pockets. General Homma on February 8 ordered the suspension of offensive operations in order to reorganize his forces. This could not be carried out immediately, because the 16th Division remained engaged trying to extricate a pocketed battalion of its 20th Infantry. With further losses, the remnants of the battalion, 378 officers and men, were extricated on February 15. On February 22, the 14th Army line withdrew a few miles to the north and USAFFE forces re-occupied the abandoned positions. The result of the "Battle of the Points" and "Battle of the Pockets" was total destruction of all three battalions of the Japanese 20th Infantry and a clear USAFFE victory.

For several weeks, the Japanese, deterred by heavy losses and reduced to a single brigade, conducted siege operations while waiting refitting and reinforcement. Both armies engaged in patrols and limited local attacks. Because of the worsening Allied position in the Asia-Pacific region, U.S. President Franklin D. Roosevelt ordered MacArthur to relocate to Australia, as Supreme Allied Commander South West Pacific Area. (MacArthur's famous speech regarding the Philippines, in which he said "I came out of Bataan and I shall return" was made at Terowie, South Australia on March 20.) Wainwright officially assumed control of what was now termed United States Forces in the Philippines (USFIP) on March 23. During this period, elements of the U.S. Philippine Division were shifted to assist in the defense of other sectors.

Beginning March 28, a new wave of Japanese air and artillery attacks hit Allied forces who were severely weakened by malnutrition, sickness and prolonged fighting. On April 3, the Japanese began to break through along Mount Samat, estimating that the offensive would require a month to end the campaign. The U.S. Philippine Division, no longer operating as a coordinated unit and exhausted by five days of nearly continuous combat, was unable to counterattack effectively against heavy Japanese assaults. On April 8, the U.S. 57th Infantry Regiment (PS) and the 31st Division (PA) were overrun near the Alangan River. The U.S. 45th Infantry Regiment (PS), under orders to reach Mariveles and evacuate to Corregidor, finally surrendered on April 10, 1942. Only 300 men of the U.S. 31st Infantry successfully reached Corregidor.

Battle of Corregidor

Corregidor (which included Fort Mills) was a U.S. Army Coast Artillery Corps position defending the entrance to Manila Bay, part of the Harbor Defenses of Manila and Subic Bays. It was armed by both older seacoast disappearing gun batteries of the 59th and 91st Coast Artillery Regiments (the latter a Philippine Scouts unit), an offshore mine field of approximately 35 groups of controlled mines, and an anti-aircraft unit, the 60th CA (AA). The latter was posted on the higher elevations of Corregidor and was able to respond successfully to the Japanese air attacks, downing many fighters and bombers. The older stationary batteries with fixed mortars and immense cannons, for defense from attack by sea, were easily put out of commission by Japanese bombers. The American soldiers and Filipino Scouts defended the small fortress until they had little left to wage a defense.

Early in 1942, the Japanese air command installed oxygen in its bombers to fly higher than the range of the Corregidor anti-aircraft batteries, and after that time, heavier bombardment began.

In December 1941, Philippines President Manuel L. Quezon, General MacArthur, other high-ranking military officers and diplomats and families escaped the bombardment of Manila and were housed in Corregidor's Malinta Tunnel. Prior to their arrival, Malinta's laterals had served as high command headquarters, hospital and storage of food and arms. In March 1942, several U.S. Navy submarines arrived on the north side of Corregidor. The Navy brought in mail, orders, and weaponry. They took away with them the high American and Filipino government officers, gold and silver and other important records. Those who were unable to escape by submarine were eventually military POWs of Japan or placed in civilian concentration camps in Manila and other locations.

Corregidor was defended by 11,000 personnel, comprising the units mentioned above that were stationed on Corregidor, the U.S. 4th Marine Regiment, and U.S. Navy personnel deployed as infantry. Some were able to get to Corregidor from the Bataan Peninsula when the Japanese overwhelmed the units there. The Japanese began their final assault on Corregidor with an artillery barrage on May 1. On the night of May 5–6, two battalions of the Japanese 61st Infantry Regiment landed at the northeast end of the island. Despite strong resistance, the Japanese established a beachhead that was soon reinforced by tanks and artillery. The defenders were quickly pushed back toward the stronghold of Malinta Hill.

Late on May 6, Wainwright asked Homma for terms of surrender. Homma insisted that surrender include all Allied forces in the Philippines. Believing that the lives of all those on Corregidor would be endangered, Wainwright accepted. On May 8, he sent a message to Sharp, ordering him to surrender the Visayan-Mindanao Force. Sharp complied, but many individuals carried on the fight as guerrillas. Few unit commanders were so hard pressed as to be forced to surrender and none had any desire to surrender. Sharp's decision to surrender involved many factors. Major Larry S. Schmidt, in a 1982 master's degree thesis, said Sharp's decision was based on two reasons: that the Japanese were capable of executing the 10,000 survivors of Corregidor, and that Sharp now knew his forces would not be reinforced by the United States, as had been previously thought.

List of U.S. generals who became prisoners-of-war

Eighteen United States Army generals surrendered to Japanese forces by May 1942:

Lieutenant General Jonathan M. Wainwright, commanding general, United States Forces in the Philippines (USFIP)
Major General Albert M. Jones, commanding general, Philippine I Corps
Major General Edward P. King, commanding general, Northern Luzon
Major General George F. Moore, commanding general, Harbor Defenses of Manila and Subic Bays/Philippine Coast Artillery
Major General George M. Parker, commanding general, Southern Luzon/Philippine II Corps
Major General William F. Sharp, commanding general, Visayan-Mindanao Force Philippines
Brigadier General Lewis C. Beebe, chief of staff to Lieutenant General Jonathan M. Wainwright
Brigadier General Clifford Bluemel, commanding general, 31st Division (Philippines)
Brigadier General William E. Brougher, commanding general, 11th Division (Philippines)
Brigadier General Bradford G. Chynoweth, commanding general, 61st Division (Philippines)
Brigadier General Charles C. Drake, commanding general, Quartermaster Corps in the Philippines
Brigadier General Arnold J. Funk, chief of staff to Major General Edward P. King
Brigadier General Maxon S. Lough, commanding general, Philippine Division
Brigadier General Allan C. McBride, deputy chief of staff to General Douglas MacArthur and commanding general of the Service Command Area  (died 9 May 1944 in a prisoner-of-war camp)
Brigadier General Clinton A. Pierce, commanding general, 26th Cavalry Regiment (Philippine Scouts)
Brigadier General Carl H. Seals, adjutant general, United States Army Forces in the Far East (USAFFE)
Brigadier General Joseph P. Vachon, commanding general, 101st Division (Philippines)
Brigadier General James R.N. Weaver, commanding general, 1st Provisional Tank Group

Two Americans serving as Philippine Army generals also surrendered to Japanese forces:

Brigadier General Guy O. Fort, commanding general, 81st Division (Philippines)  (executed 11 November 1942 in a prisoner-of-war camp)
Brigadier General Luther R. Stevens, commanding general, 91st Division (Philippines)

The other Philippine Army generals captured by Japanese forces were native Filipinos like Major General Guillermo B. Francisco and Brigadier Generals Mateo M. Capinpin, Vicente P. Lim and Fidel V. Segundo. Ten U.S. Army generals and General Stevens surrendered at Bataan in April 1942. Generals Wainwright, Moore, Beebe and Drake surrendered at Corregidor in May 1942. Generals Sharp, Chynoweth, Seals, Vachon and Fort were captured in the southern Philippines.

Aftermath

General Homma's victory in the Philippines were received, insofar as the Imperial General Headquarters, specifically Premier Hideki Tojo, was not as lukewarm as he would hope for. They scoffed at Homma's supposed inefficiency and lack of drive to defeat the American officers according to their planned timetable. Homma, then was recalled back to Tokyo and forced to live as a reserved officer.

The defeat was the beginning of three and a half years of harsh treatment for the Allied survivors, including atrocities like the Bataan Death March and the misery of Japanese prison camps, and the "hell ships" on which American and Allied men were sent to Japan to be used as slave labor in mines and factories. Thousands were crowded into the holds of Japanese ships without water, food, or sufficient ventilation. The Japanese did not mark "POW" on the decks of these vessels, and some were attacked and sunk by Allied aircraft and submarines. Although the campaign was a victory to the Japanese, it took longer than anticipated to defeat the Filipinos and Americans. This required forces that would have been used to attack Borneo and Java to be diverted to the battle in the Philippines, and also slowed the advance on New Guinea and the Solomon Islands.

During the occupation of the Philippines, Americans and Filipino guerrillas fought against the occupying forces. The Allied and Philippine Commonwealth forces began the campaign to recapture the Philippines in 1944, with landings on the island of Leyte.

On January 29, 1945, US and Philippine forces liberated POWs in the Raid at Cabanatuan.

Importance

The defense of the Philippines was the longest resistance to the Japanese Imperial Army in the initial stages of World War II. After the Battle of Abucay the Japanese started to withdraw from Bataan, and resumed their attack in April, allowing MacArthur 40 days to prepare Australia as an operational base, the initial resistance in the Philippines allowed Australia crucial time to organize for its defense. Philippine-American resistance against the Japanese up to the fall of Bataan on April 9, 1942, lasted 105 days (3 months and 2 days).

USAFFE order of battle, December 3, 1941; casualty reports

United States Army Forces Far East
 Philippine Constabulary
 1st PC Regiment
 2nd PC Regiment
 3rd PC Regiment
 4th PC Regiment
 HQ Philippine Dept
 Headquarters- Harbor Defenses of Manila and Subic Bays
 Philippine Division {PS-Philippine Scouts} {As of July 31, 1941 Division numbered 10,743}
 Post Service Command {PS}. ABMC lists 175 dead
 1st Philippine Coast Artillery. ABMC lists 1 dead
 12th Medical Battalion {PS}. ABMC lists 121 dead
 12th Medical Regiment {PS}. ABMC lists 13 dead
 12th Military Police Company {PS}. ABMC lists 40 dead
 12th Ordnance Company {PS}. ABMC lists 45 dead
 12th Quartermaster Battalion HQ {PS}. ABMC lists 3 dead
 12th Quartermaster Battalion {PS}. ABMC lists 70 dead
 12th Quartermaster Regiment (United States) (PS). ABMC lists 90 dead
 12th Signal Company {PS}. ABMC lists 77 dead
 14th Engineer Regiment {PS}. ABMC lists 324 dead
 14th Engineer Battalion {PS}. ABMC lists 4 dead
 17th Ordnance Company {US Army}. ABMC lists 45 dead
 23rd Field Artillery (PS) {Btry A}. ABMC lists 159 dead+ 1 dead {1st Battalion}
 24th Field Artillery {PS}. ABMC lists 309 dead
 26th Cavalry Regiment (PS). ABMC lists 301 dead
 31st Infantry {US Army}. ABMC lists 936 dead
 43rd Infantry(PS). ABMC lists 31 dead
 45th Infantry(PS). ABMC lists 1,039 dead
 47th Motor Transport Company (PS). ABMC lists 1 dead
 57th Infantry(PS). ABMC lists 983 dead
 59th Coast Artillery {US Army}.{Corregidor} ABMC lists 329 dead+1 {Col Paul Bunker}
 60th Coast Artillery (United States).{Corregidor} ABMC lists 390 dead
 71st Medical Battalion (PS). ABMC lists 0 dead
 74th Quartermaster Bakery Co (PS). ABMC lists 17 dead
 75th Ordnance Depot Company {US Army}. ABMC lists 3 dead
 75th Ordnance Company {US Army}. ABMC lists 35 dead
 86th Field Artillery (PS). ABMC lists 169 total (8 Dead for Regiment + 161 dead for Battalion)
 88th Field Artillery {PS}. ABMC lists 186 dead
 91st Coast Artillery {PS}. ABMC lists 202 dead
 92nd Coast Artillery {PS}.{Corregidor} ABMC lists 200 dead
 200th Coast Artillery {US Army}- ABMC lists 373 dead
 202nd Philippine Engineer Battalion {US Army}. ABMC lists 9 dead
 252nd Signal Construction Company {PS}. ABMC lists 44 dead
 515th Coast Artillery Regiment.{US Army} ABMC lists 207 dead
 808th MP Company {US Army} – ABMC lists 90 dead
 Provisional Tank Group: under the command of BG James Weaver.
 17th Ordnance Battalion (one Company) ABMC lists 45 dead
 192nd Tank Battalion – ABMC lists 189 dead+ HQ Co 192nd Tank Battalion -ABMC lists 2 dead. {Note-192nd Tank Battalion article reports 328 did not survive the war}
 194th Tank Battalion – (less Company B). ABMC lists 183 dead
 Far East Air Force commanded by Maj. Gen. Lewis H. Brereton; also commanded by Brig General Harold Huston George {Killed in flying accident Australia April 30, 1942}
 5th Air Base Group
 V Bomber Command
 19th Bomb Group (Heavy) (Headquarters, Clark Field) ABMC lists 3 dead; HQ Squadron 19th BG ABMC list 103 dead;
 14th Bomb Squadron (Del Monte Field, December 5, 8 B-17) ABMC lists 13 dead
 28th Bomb Squadron (Clark Field, 8 B-17) ABMC lists 93 dead
 30th Bomb Squadron (Clark Field, 9 B-17) ABMC lists 110 dead
 93rd Bomb Squadron (Del Monte Field, December 5, 8 B-17) ABMC lists 116 dead
 440th Ordnance Squadron ABMC Lists 68 dead
 27th Bomb Group (Light) Headquarters ABMC lists 3 dead
 2nd Observation Squadron (Nichols Field, 21 various aircraft) ABMC lists 71 dead
 16th Bomb Squadron (Fort William McKinley) ABMC lists 72 Dead
 17th Bomb Squadron (San Fernando Field) ABMC Lists 62 dead
 91st Bomb Squadron(San Marceleno Field-B-18) ABMC lists 76 dead
 48th Material Squadron ABMC lists 53 dead+ 19 also listed dead when the 48th Squadron was part of V Air Base Group
 454th Ordnance Squadron ABMC lists 71 dead
Note: ground echelon of the 27th Bomb Group at Bataan fought as 2nd Battalion (27th Bombardment Group) Provisional Infantry Regiment (Air Corp).
 V Interceptor Command
 19th Air Base Group ABMC list 1 died
 20th Air Base Group ABMC list 1 dead
 Tow Target Detachment
 5th Communications Detachment. ABMC lists 0 dead
 5th Weather Detachment ABMC lists 0 Dead
 Chemical Warfare Det,
 4th Chemical Company (Aviation). ABMC lists 33 dead
 5th Chemical Detachment (Company-Aviation) ABMC lists 2 dead
 19th Air Base Squadron. ABMC lists 79 dead
 27th Material Squadron. ABMC lists 75 dead
 28th Material Squadron. ABMC lists 92 dead
 47th Material Squadron.
 803d Engineering Detachment (Battalion-Aviation). ABMC lists 232 dead
 809th Engineering Detachment
 409th Signal/Communications Detachment (Company-Aviation) ABMC lists 29 dead
 429th Maintenance Detachment
 24th Pursuit Group (Headquarters, Clark Field). Colonel Orrin l. Grover. HQ Squadron ABMC lists 112 dead
 3rd Pursuit Squadron (Iba Field, 18 P-40E) ABMC lists 0 dead
 17th Pursuit Squadron (Nichols Field, 18 P-40E) ABMC Lists 0 dead
 20th Pursuit Squadron (Clark Field, 18 P-40B) ABMC Lists 96 dead
 35th Pursuit Group (headquarters en route to Philippines) ABMC lists 5 dead
 21st Pursuit Squadron (attached 24th PG, Nichols Field, 18 P-40E received December 7) ABMC lists 89 dead
 34th Pursuit Squadron (attached 24th PG, Del Carmen Field, 18 P-35A received December 7) ABMC lists 0 dead
 Philippine Aircraft Warning Detachment
 6th Pursuit Squadron, Philippine Army Air Corps (Batangas Field, 12 P-26) ABMC lists 1 dead

Philippine Army
 HQ Philippine Army:
 11th Division
 HQ 11th Division: ABMC lists 1 dead
 HQ Com 11th Division: ABMC lists 1 dead
 11th Field Artillery Regt: ABMC lists 1 dead
 11th Infantry Regiment: ABMC lists 4 dead
 12th Infantry Regiment: ABMC lists 2 dead
 13th Infantry Regiment: ABMC lists 1 dead
 21st Division
 21st Engr Battalion: ABMC lists 2 dead
 21st Field Artillery Regiment: ABMC lists 3 dead
 21st Infantry Regiment: ABMC lists 3 dead
 22nd Infantry Regiment: ABMC lists 3 dead
 31st Division
 31st Engr Battalion: ABMC lists 1 dead
 31st Field Artillery Regt: ABMC lists 2 dead
 31st Infantry Regiment: ABMC lists 6 dead
 32nd Infantry Regiment: ABMC lists 3 dead
 41st Division: Commanding general Vicente Lim {ABMC listed dead}
 41st Engr Battalion: ABMC lists 1 dead
 41st Infantry Regiment: ABMC Lists 6 dead
 42nd Infantry Regiment: ABMC lists 4 dead
 51st Division
 51st Field Artillery Regiment: ABMC lists 4 dead
 51st Infantry Regiment: ABMC lists 4 dead
 52nd Infantry Regiment: ABMC lists 4 dead
 53rd Infantry Regiment: ABMC lists 4 dead
 61st Division
 HQ 61st Division: ABMC Lists 1 dead
 61st Field Artillery Regiment: ABMC lists 4 dead
 61st Infantry Regiment: ABMC lists 1 dead
 62nd Infantry Regiment: ABMC lists 4 dead
 63rd Infantry Regiment: ABMC Lists 1 dead
 71st Division
 71st Field Artillery Regt: ABMC Lists 1 dead
 71st Infantry Regiment: ABMC lists 2 dead
 72nd Infantry Regiment: ABMC lists 6 dead
 73rd Infantry Regiment: ABMC lists 3 dead
 75th Infantry Regiment: ABMC lists 1 dead
 71st Quartermaster Co: ABMC lists 1 dead
 81st Division-Brig Gen Guy O. Fort {KIA}
 81st Division: ABMC lists 5 dead
 81st Engr Batt.: ABMC lists 1 dead
 81st Field Artillery Regt: ABMC lists 2 dead
 82nd Infantry Regiment: ABMC lists 2 dead
 83rd Infantry Regiment: ABMC lists 1 dead
 91st Division
 HQ 91st Division: ABMC lists 1 dead
 91st Field Artillery Regiment: ABMC lists 5 dead
 91st Infantry Regiment: ABMC lists 2 dead
 92nd Infantry Regiment: ABMC lists 5 dead
 93rd Infantry Regiment: ABMC lists 1 dead
 101st Division
 ABMC lists 1 with Division;
 101st Engr Battalion; ABMC Lists 1 dead;
 101st Field Artillery Regt; ABMC lists 1 dead;
 101st Inf Regt; ABMC lists 7 dead;
 102nd Inf Regt; ABMC lists 0 dead;
 103rd Inf Regt; ABMC lists 3 dead

Harbor Defenses of Manila and Subic Bays: For Strength in November 1941 see 
Note: Harbor defenses included units listed above:
 HQ and HQ Battery;
 59th Coast Artillery; See above for casualty listings
 60th Coast Artillery; See above for casualty listings
 91st Coast Artillery {PS}; See above for casualty listings
 92nd Coast Artillery {PS}; See above for casualty listings
 USAMP Harrison Station Hospital
 Chemical Warfare Det.

United States Navy
Admiral Thomas C. Hart–United States Asiatic Fleet and 16th Naval District,
 1 heavy cruiser--for fate-see below
 2 light cruisers:
 
 
 13 destroyers:
 Destroyer Squadron 29-Captain Herbert V. Wiley
 
 
 Destroyer Division 50-Commander P.H. Talbot
 
 
 
 
 Destroyer Division 57-Commander E.M. Crouch
 
 
 
 
 Destroyer Division 58-Commander Thomas H. Binford
 
 
 
 
 
 US Submarines at Manila/Mariveles Naval Section Base;Cavite, Philippines; consisted of
 Submarine Squadron 2 consisted of 12 Salmon-class submarines and
 Submarine Squadron 5 of 11 Porpoise and Sargo-class submarines.
 Submarine Squadron 21 of 4 Porpoise and Sargo-class submarines + submarine tender 
 
 
 
 
 
 
 
 
 
 
 
 
 
 
 
 
 
 
 
 
 
 
 
 
 
 
 
 PT Boat Squadron 3-for fate see below
 China Yangtze Patrol: Rear Admiral William A. Glassford – for fate see below-5 out of six ships lost:
 
 Patrol Wing 10: Capt. Frank D. Wagner – Cavite Naval Base, Luzon, Philippines.
 VP-101
 VP-102
 
 
 
 In December 1941, naval forces were augmented by the following:
 schooner USS Lanikai.
 Station Cast US Navy Code breaking on the Japanese military; evacuated to Australia 1942
 Navy losses:
 Cruiser  (lost March 1, 1942, 368 survived of 1,061 crew),
 PT Boat Motor Torpedo Boat Squadron Three 6 PT boats (PT-31, PT-32, PT-33, PT-34, PT-35, PT-41)—all lost December 6, 1941 – March 1942.
  scuttled December 10, 1941
  escaped to Australia; sunk March 1, 1942
  scuttled April 10, 1942 {548 crew served with 4th Marine Regiment-212 KIA/MIA}
  scuttled May 5, 1942 but salvaged by the Japanese; sunk on November 5, 1944
  ran out of fuel and abandoned March, sunk by Japanese on April 9, 1942; salvaged as IJN Patrol Boat 103, sunk in 1945.
  escaped to Dutch East Indies and Australia; lost May 8, 1942.
  scuttled December 1941
 USC&GSS Research beached January 30, 1942
  escaped to Australia; sunk February 19, 1942
  escaped to Australia; scuttled March 3, 1942 {6 out of 54 crew did not survive the war}
  escaped to Australia; lost with all hands April 3, 1943
  sunk May 4, 1942.
  escaped to Dutch East Indies; sunk March 2, 1942
  escaped to Dutch East Indies; sunk March 1, 1942
  scuttled following damage by air and surface attack May 5, 1942
  scuttled following grounding January 21, 1942
  run aground and abandoned August 13, 1942
  scuttled December 25, 1941 after damage December 10, 1941; 5 crewmen lost in war
  escaped to Java and scuttled March 2, 1942; salvaged as IJN Patrol Boat 102, sunk in 1946
 In addition 2 district patrol craft YP-16 and YP-17 and about 70 miscellaneous district craft were lost in the Philippines in 1942. (See listing in List of United States Navy losses in World War II)
 China Yangtze Patrol-five of six vessels lost:
  lost March 3, 1942; 161 crew lost
  lost May 2, 1942;
  sunk May 5, 1942;
  captured December 8, 1941

United States Marine Corps
 4th Marine Regiment (Commander Colonel Samuel L. Howard) stationed at Corregidor; consisted of 142 different organizations:
 USMC: 72 officers; 1,368 enlisted
 USN: 37 officers; 848 enlisted
 USAAC/PA: 111 officers; 1,455 enlisted

4th Marines Casualties were 315 killed/15 MIA/357 WIA in the Philippine Campaign. 105 Marines were captured on Bataan and 1,283 captured on Corregidor of whom 490 didn't survive.

Miscellaneous

Harbor Defenses, April 15, 1942 (Maj. Gen. George F. Moore):
 US Army: 5,012
 US Navy: 2,158
 USMC: 1,617
 Philippine Scouts: 1,298
 Philippine Army: 1,818
 Philippine Navy: 400
 US Civilians: 343
 Civilians (other): 2,082
 Army Nurse Corps, Navy Nurse Corps: 78 ("Angels of Bataan")

See also
 Day of Valor

References

Notes

Books
 
 
 
 
 
 
 
 
 
 
 
 
 
 
 
 
 
 
 
 
 Zaloga, Steven J. Japanese Tanks 1939–45''. Osprey, 2007. .

Further reading
 
 
 
 
  – full text
 
 
  Report by MacArthur's staff

External links

 
 Battle for Bataan

South West Pacific theatre of World War II
Military history of the Philippines during World War II
1941 in the Philippines
1942 in the Philippines
United States Marine Corps in World War II
P
Invasions of the Philippines
Invasions by Japan
World War II invasions
1941 in military history
1942 in military history
Amphibious operations of World War II
Japan–Philippines military relations